Ruritan National is a service club located in small towns and rural areas in the United States.  It aims to achieve "Fellowship, Goodwill and Community Service".  The local clubs are autonomous from the national organization.  Many Ruritan clubs sponsor local clubs or chapters of 4-H, the National FFA Organization, or a Boy Scouts of America troop.

Unlike most community service organizations, Ruritan rarely has national programs. Rather, each club surveys the needs of its own community and then works to meet some of those needs. Many clubs provide and supervise community recreational centers, sponsor little league and other athletic programs, sponsor anti-litter campaigns, help the sick and needy and provide a wide range of other activities to help improve their communities.

History 
The first Ruritan Club was chartered May 21, 1928, in Holland, Virginia, now part of Suffolk, Virginia.
Since that first club, Ruritan has grown throughout the United States of America, and in doing so, has become "America's Leading Community Service Organization," with over 23,000 members in nearly 1000 clubs.

Organization 
The Ruritan organization is made of Ruritan Clubs.  Club officers consist of a President, Vice-President, Secretary, Treasurer, Immediate Past President, and 1st-, 2nd- and 3rd-Year Directors.  Clubs are organized into zones, overseen by a zone governor and zones are organized into districts.

References

External links 
 
 State Listing of Ruritan Clubs
 Holland District Ruritans (The first Ruritan Club's District Website)

1928 establishments in Virginia
Service organizations based in the United States
Rural society in the United States
Organizations established in 1928